The 2014–15 season was Liverpool Football Club's 123rd season in existence and their 53rd consecutive season in the top flight of English football. It was also the club's 23rd consecutive season in the Premier League. Along with the Premier League, Liverpool also competed in the FA Cup, Football League Cup and UEFA Champions League (which they entered for the first time since 2009–10). Having finished third in their group, Liverpool subsequently dropped down to the UEFA Europa League.

Season review
Hopes were high at Liverpool, after a title run the previous season had seen them finish runners-up to eventual champions Manchester City. Following the sale of star striker Luis Suárez in the summer, the club spent £117 million on 10 new arrivals to Anfield. Expectations were high as the new season started.

However, it did not take long for things to slowly unravel. Without Suarez, Liverpool only accumulated 28 points from a possible 57, equalling their worst league start for 50 years - ending the calendar year in 8th position. They also bowed out of the Champions League at the first hurdle, finishing 3rd in their group.

Despite this awful spell, the Reds eventually recovered after the New Year, and embarked on a 12-match unbeaten run, lifting hopes of Champions League qualification. However, after losing to Manchester United again, Liverpool then suffered another poor run, which saw them win just twice in their last eight games. This killed off their hopes of Champions League qualification for the following season, although they did seal Europa League qualification for 2015–16 courtesy of Arsenal's 4–0 win over Aston Villa in the FA Cup Final.

The Reds reached both the FA Cup and Capital One Cup semi-finals, where they lost Aston Villa and Chelsea, respectively.

This was also captain Steven Gerrard's final season at the club due to the expiration of his contract, ending his 17-year spell at Liverpool. Raheem Sterling was sold to Manchester City for £50m in May.

First team
As it stood on 24 May 2015

Transfers and loans

Transfers in

Loans in

Transfers out

Loans out

Transfer summary

Expenditure

Summer:  £117,000,000

Winter:  £0

Total:  £117,000,000

Income

Summer:  £73,000,000

Winter:  £5,700,000

Total:  £78,700,000

Total

Summer:  £43,550,000

Winter:  £5,700,000

Total:  £38,300,000

Reserves team and Academy team
For more information on Liverpool's Reserve squad and The Academy see Liverpool F.C. Reserves and Academy

Friendlies

Pre-season

International Champions Cup

Competitions

Overall

Overview

{| class="wikitable" style="text-align: center"
|-
!rowspan=2|Competition
!colspan=8|Record
|-
!
!
!
!
!
!
!
!
|-
| Premier League

|-
| FA Cup

|-
| League Cup

|-
| Champions League

|-
| Europa League

|-
! Total

Premier League

League table

Results summary

Results by matchday

Matches

FA Cup

League Cup

UEFA Champions League

Group stage

UEFA Europa League

Knockout phase

Round of 32

Squad statistics

Appearances

Numbers in parentheses denote appearances as substitute.
Players with no appearances not included in the list.

Goalscorers
Includes all competitive matches.

** Players who no longer play for Liverpool's current season

Disciplinary record

Awards

Liverpool Players awards
The Players' Awards were held on 19 May at the Echo Arena.

Liverpool Player's Player of the Year Award: Philippe Coutinho
Liverpool Supporter's Player of the Year Award: Philippe Coutinho
Liverpool Supporter's Young Player of the Year Award: Raheem Sterling
Goal of the Season Award: Philippe Coutinho for his long range strike v Southampton, February 22.
Performance of the Year: Philippe Coutinho v Manchester City, March 1
Outstanding Achievement Award: Steven Gerrard
Academy Players' Player of the Year: João Carlos Teixeira
Lifetime Achievement Award: Ron Yeats and Ian St John

Liverpool Player of the Month award

Awarded monthly to the player that was chosen by fans voting on Liverpoolfc.com

References

Liverpool
Liverpool F.C. seasons
Liverpool